Maria Anna of Bavaria may refer to:

Maria Anna of Bavaria (1551–1608), who married her uncle Charles II, Archduke of Austria
Maria Anna of Bavaria (1574–1616), who married Ferdinand II, Holy Roman Emperor, niece of the above
Duchess Maria Anna of Bavaria, married Louis, Dauphin of France (1661–1711), great-granddaughter of the first, grandniece of the above
Maria Anna of Bavaria (1805-1877), who married Frederick Augustus II of Saxony
Maria Anna of Bavaria (b. 1975), youngest daughter of Prince Max, Duke in Bavaria.